The 2018 Asian Wrestling Championships took place at the Kojomkul Sports Palace, Bishkek in Kyrgyzstan. The event took place from February 27 to March 4, 2018.

Medal table

Team ranking

Medal summary

Men's freestyle

Men's Greco-Roman

Women's freestyle

Participating nations 
318 competitors from 20 nations competed.

 (2)
 (28)
 (10)
 (30)
 (20)
 (10)
 (30)
 (4)
 (30)
 (24)
 (20)
 (6)
 (1)
 (1)
 (29)
 (18)
 (8)
 (11)
 (30)
 (6)

References

Results Book
Updated Results Book

External links
UWW
LIVE Asian Wrestling Championships

Asia
Asian Wrestling Championships
Wrestling
International sports competitions hosted by Kyrgyzstan
Asian Wrestling Championships
Asian Wrestling Championships
Sport in Bishkek